Union Sportive Médina d'Alger is an Algerian association football club based in Algiers, that competes in the Algerian Ligue Professionnelle 1. The club was formed in Algiers in 1937 as Union Sportive Musulmane d'Alger before it was renamed Union Sportive Médina d'Alger in 1962. the team changed its name, one more time in 1977 to be named that time Union sportive kahraba d'Alger, in 1987 the club name was changed again to Union d'Alger until 1989 faced with a major financial and economic crisis, the Algerian government in place in 1989 decides to abandon the 1977 reform. they recovered their old name Union Sportive Médina d'Alger. Before independence, the team played in many degrees in Ligue d'Alger, third, second, and first division, but they had never played in Honor Division the highest degree then. On March 15, 2020, the Ligue de Football Professionnel (LFP) decided to halt the season due to the COVID-19 pandemic in Algeria. On July 29, 2020, the LFP declared that season is over USM Alger did not play all of its matches and settled with 22 out of 30 matches of 2019–20 season.

Key
The records include the results of matches played in the Algerian Championnat National (from 1964 to 2010) and the Algerian Ligue Professionnelle 1 (since 2010).
  Teams with this background and symbol in the "Club" column are competing in the 2021–22 Algerian Ligue Professionnelle 1 alongside USM Alger.
  Clubs with this background and symbol in the "Club" column are defunct.
P = matches played; W = matches won; D = matches drawn; L = matches lost; F = Goals scored; A = Goals conceded; Win% = percentage of total matches won

All-time league record

Algerian Ligue Professionnelle 1
Statistics correct as of game against ES Sétif on June 17, 2022

Overall record
Statistics correct as of game against ES Sétif on June 17, 2022

Footnotes

References
Specific

General
 

League Record By Opponent
USM Alger